I is the fifth EP by Swedish extreme metal band Meshuggah. It was released on 13 July 2004 via Fractured Transmitter Recording Company. A remastered reissue was released on 30 September 2014.

The "Special Edition" adds "Bleed" and "Dancers to a Discordant System" live from The Ophidian Trek and Pitch Black.

Background
Meshuggah drummer Tomas Haake said of the EP, "That whole track was written and recorded just on random. Me and Fredrik would just jam on something, and when we found something that was kind of cool, he would walk into the control room. I would just record drums and it wasn't a set pattern, I would just kind of stray away from the pattern, but just keep going in that vibe. Then we had to chart everything and go bar by bar to record the guitars afterwards, because it's all just random." Thordendal would later post the chart of the first part of the song on his Instagram account.

Haake later commented that the song was "originally recorded for Jason Popson's Fractured Transmitter record label" and that it was a "'one-off' that Nuclear Blast gave us the go-ahead for — as we were under contract with them."

Track listing
The original vinyl release has track 1 on side A, and tracks 2-4 on side B while the 2016 re-issue only has track 1

Personnel
 Tomas Haake – drums
 Mårten Hagström – rhythm guitar
Jens Kidman – vocals
 Fredrik Thordendal – lead guitar, bass

References

Meshuggah albums
2004 EPs